The Tenmile Range is a mountain range in U.S. state of Colorado.  The range is an extension of the Mosquito Range which is part of the Rocky Mountains.  The two ranges are effectively the same range.  They are split only by the Continental Divide and name. The Tenmile Range is on the north side of the divide, and the Mosquito on the south.  The range is often referred to as the Tenmile-Mosquito Range.

There are more than a dozen peaks in the range. Peak 1 is the northernmost peak. The sub-peaks of Mt. Victoria and Mt. Royal are located north of Peak 1. Tenmile Peak, south of Peak 1, is also known as Peak 2. Quandary Peak is the southernmost peak and highest point in the Range, elevation 14,271 feet.

The range is famous for its skiing, both backcountry and resort areas. Breckenridge Ski Resort is in the range.

The Tenmile Range includes Pacific Tarn, believed to be the highest named lake in the United States.

Approximately  of the Tenmile Range is protected in the Camp Hale – Continental Divide National Monument.

Highest peaks 
 Quandary Peak 14,271
 Fletcher Mountain 13,951
 Pacific Peak
 Unnamed Peak (commonly known as "Drift Peak") 13,900
 Crystal Peak 13,852
 Atlantic Peak 13,841
 Wheeler Mountain 13,690
 Peak 10 13,633
 Father Dyer Peak 13,615, named for the clergyman John Lewis Dyer
 North Star Mountain 13,614

Additional information
 Peak 1 is the northernmost peak of the range.
 The numbered peaks begin with Peak 1 which is directly north of Tenmile Peak. This peak used to have a ski jumping hill for the town of Frisco. South of Peak 1 are Peaks 2 through 10.  There are more than a dozen peaks in the range. The southernmost is Quandary Peak.  Wheeler Peak and North Star Mountain sit in both the Ten Mile (north) and Mosquito Ranges (south), straddling the Continental Divide.
 Breckenridge Ski Resort occupies the east faces of Peaks 6-10. The summits of Peak 6 and Peak 8 are both accessible by chairlift. The Kensho SuperChair on Peak 6 terminates at a crest in a ridge 300 feet below the summit, while the Imperial Express SuperChair stops at 12,840 feet, 160 feet below the summit of Peak 8. The true summits of both peaks can then be accessed by a short hike from the top of either lift.

Gallery

References

External links
 Tenmile Range @ Peakbagger

Mountain ranges of Colorado
Ranges of the Rocky Mountains
Landforms of Summit County, Colorado